A yearbook, also known as an annual, is a type of a book published annually. One use is to record, highlight, and commemorate the past year of a school. The term also refers to a book of statistics or facts published annually. A yearbook often has an overarching theme that is present throughout the entire book.

Many high schools, colleges, elementary and middle schools publish yearbooks; however, many schools are dropping yearbooks or decreasing page counts given social media alternatives to a mass-produced physical photographically-oriented record. From 1995 to 2013, the number of U.S. college yearbooks dropped from roughly 2,400 to 1,000.

History
A marble slab commemorating a class of military cadets in Ancient Athens during the time of the Roman Empire is an early example of this sort of document. Proto-yearbooks in the form of scrapbooks appeared in US East Coast schools towards the end of the 17th century. The first formal modern yearbook was the 1806 Profiles of Part of the Class Graduated at Yale College.

Yearbooks by country

Australia
Yearbooks published by Australian schools follow a consistent structure to their North American counterparts. Australian yearbooks function as an annual magazine for the school body, with a significant focus on objectively reporting the events that occurred during the schooling year. Yearbook staff predominantly consists of only one or two school teachers who serve as editors in chief. Australian school yearbooks are predominantly created on A4 paper size, featuring a softcover style front-and-back cover, typically 250 or 300 g/m2 density. Hardcover style yearbooks are not as common, although exceptions occur.

 This is sold as allowing a higher level of student involvement whilst making the workflow simpler and easier for all involved. Additionally, some schools feature a separate yearbook for students in year 2.

Publishing 
Australian school yearbooks are primarily published with technology, with a mix of color, spot color, and black and white pages, depending on the school's budget.

India 
India does not have a long history of publishing school yearbooks. However, top Business schools and Engineering colleges publish custom yearbooks. This is typically created by the final year students of the batch. A yearbook or a memory book would consist of testimonials and common pages such as Director's address and events, and festivals' picture collages.

Most top schools do create schools magazines that are shared with each student. Some of the early adopters among school students are starting to create custom yearbooks in the same line as created by students from the US or Europe. This trend is likely to pick up with the advent of technology platforms that make it easy for students to create them.

Nigeria
In Nigeria, it is very common to find yearbooks in schools as it is in countries such as the US and Canada, though several schools allocate annual funding and publish yearbooks at the end of the school year (July or August). These yearbooks closely resemble those found in the US, with columns about certain themes, in-depth coverage of major events, and large collections of photos, as well as drawings reflecting daily life at these schools. Some schools do produce yearbooks yearly.

South Africa
In South Africa, it is not as common to find yearbooks in schools as it is in countries such as the US and Canada, though several schools allocate annual funding and publish yearbooks at the end of the school year (November or December). These yearbooks closely resemble those found in the US, with columns about certain themes, in-depth coverage of major events, and large collections of photos, as well as drawings reflecting daily life at these schools.

Major events covered include Matric Farewell Dances (equivalent to Senior Prom in the US), annual sporting events (such as Inter-schools where several schools assemble and compete in various sports as well as with dance routines in competition for spirit awards, etc.), and grade group events organized specifically for a specific grade.

United States
Elementary and middle schools may have a designated staff member who is in charge of putting together that school's yearbook, with or without the help of the students. These books are usually considerably smaller than a high school or college yearbook.

High school yearbooks generally cover a wide variety of topics from academics, student life, sports, clubs, and other major school events. Generally, each student is pictured with their class, while seniors might get a page-width picture or a slightly larger photo than the underclassmen to reflect their status in the school. Each school organization, such as a sports team or academic/social club, is usually pictured. A high school yearbook staff consists of students with one or more faculty advisors. The yearbook staff can be chosen in a variety of ways, including volunteer extracurricular organization, academic class, or assigned to the entire senior class.

High school yearbooks are considered a form of journalism by scholastic journalism such as the Columbia Scholastic Press Association, the National Scholastic Press Association, the Journalism Education Association and state and regional scholastic press associations. Numerous awards are given for journalistic excellence annually.

Colleges that publish yearbooks follow a similar format to high schools. Some include detailed recaps of football and basketball games. College yearbooks are considered by the Associated Collegiate Press (ACP) to be a form of journalism. ACP holds the annual Pacemaker competition for college yearbooks as well as other collegiate media outlets. Many colleges have phased out yearbooks due to high prices and low demand, while some, like Auburn University, opt to support annual publications with relatively small portions of student fees to continue this over 120-year-old tradition. The Glomerata continues to be one of the most circulated yearbooks in the country, distributing 8,000 copies to Auburn University's student body in April 2018.

U.S. military

Warships of the United States Navy often produce a yearbook-style publication upon completion of a long deployment (typically six months or more). These books, referred to by sailors as "cruise books" are produced on board by the ship's Morale, Welfare, and Recreation department and Public Affairs staff, and then printed ashore by the same printing companies that publish high school and college yearbooks. The cruise book of a Nimitz-class aircraft carrier typically reaches over 600 pages in length, as it includes portraits of the more than 5,000 sailors and Marines assigned to the ship's company and embarked carrier air wing.

The Navy's Recruit Training Center in Great Lakes, Illinois also produces yearbook-style publications for each graduating division of recruits. These publications are much smaller, as each recruit division totals roughly 80 sailors. The book is called "The Keel" after the part of a ship that is constructed first, as RTC or boot camp sets the foundation for the sailor's career. These books contain a color section common to all books published that year, with a specific black and white section added for each recruit division and their "brother" or "sister" division.

Production and distribution

Compilation
Yearbooks are generally compiled by a student club or a yearbook class, usually advised by a faculty member. The yearbook staff usually has one or more editors who are responsible for collecting and compiling all of the information to be contained within the book, also deciding the layout and allocation of space for each contributor.

Sections
Most yearbooks have a similar format, which includes individual photographs of students, information on activities, sports, and other activities.

People (seniors, underclassmen, faculty)
In the U.S., where a yearbook often covers the whole school and not just the senior class, these sections are usually arranged in chronological order by class (freshmen, sophomore, junior, and senior), in either ascending or descending order. Normally students will have individual portraits accompanied by their names. Senior photographs are usually larger than those of underclassmen and are sometimes accompanied by text about their accomplishments throughout high school and their plans. Frequently, seniors are polled to nominate their classmates for "superlatives" or "class celebrities" (such as "most likely to succeed", "most athletic", "most spirited", "best smile", and "class clown"), are often published in the senior section. In addition, seniors are dressed formally. Some private schools and smaller high schools set aside an entire page for each senior. These pages are sometimes designed by the seniors themselves, with each senior submitting a digital or physical version of the page they would like featured in the book.

"Picture Day" is the school day in the United States and Canada when students have their photographs taken by a professional photographer. Parents can purchase packages of these portraits to distribute, often accompanied by other items featuring the portrait.  The pictures are not inexpensive for the amount of time and effort involved – which can be less than one minute per student – partly because the photography company usually pays the school part of the price for each photo sold in a "rebate" or unadvertised "fundraising" scheme. These portraits often go into the school yearbook, which are usually distributed at the end of the school year. The pictures may also be used on student ID cards. There will also generally be a second day ("retake day") to take pictures if the student is absent.

In the UK and other countries, where yearbooks often only cover the final year group and not the entire school, each student may have more space for answers to various questions as well as their photo (or photos). In Year 11 (England & Wales) members are usually grouped by form/class; whilst Year 13 tends not to be grouped in such a way, but instead, just appears alphabetically throughout the book. It's common in these markets for each person to have between a quarter and a whole page each, depending on the budget available for the yearbook (as more pages mean a higher cost). The editorial team chooses questions for members to answer (such as "Favourite teacher?" or "Where will you be in 5 years?") and these answers appear alongside member photos. These photos and answers are sometimes also collected online.

Student life
Several pages are often used for pages chronicling activities undertaken by students, such as trips abroad, activity trips, sporting, and other special events. This part of the book often covers students' lives both inside and outside of the campus.

Sometimes members of a yearbook write editorial and journalistic content about life as a student, current events (local, national, and international), and other matters of interest to the peer group.

Academics/education
This section covers the classes, projects, and more educational aspects of the school year.

Organizations
This section describes student organizations (sometimes referred to as clubs) and what they did during the year. These descriptions are often accompanied by a photo or photos of the organization's members. This section sometimes includes a list of the members of each organization.

Sports
Often listed by season or club, these pages chronicle the accomplishments of the school's teams. Along with a short article listing the season's highlights, these pages include team photographs and action pictures.

Advertising pages

Many yearbooks gain revenue by including a section of ads from local businesses.

Some schools sell advertisements for seniors. Parents, other family members, and friends use these ads to congratulate a senior — or group of seniors — for their accomplishments.

Index
Bigger yearbooks tend to include an alphabetical listing of everyone included in the yearbook, along with a listing of the pages they may be found on.

Colophon
Usually, near the end of the book, the colophon lists staff members and acknowledgments. The colophon includes technical information about the yearbook such as publisher, the total number of pages, paperweight, and copyright.

Signature or autograph page
Some yearbooks contain a few pages which will be left blank for people to write messages about the preceding year and summer.  This tradition was inherited from commonplace books.

Design 

Students may design yearbook pages themselves or use company-provided templates in most cases.

In general, most yearbook pages are designed as double-page spreads and include several items:
 Headline: An abbreviated sentence highlighting the content of the spread, usually involving wordplay along with factual information
 Story/Copy: Staffs usually write short stories capturing the highlights of a specific department, sports season, organization, etc., from the past year. Often, yearbook staff members will interview students, teachers, and others for comments. Alternative story formats have gained popularity in recent times, allowing stories to be told in visual ways (graphs, charts, polls, timelines, etc.).
 Photographs: Every spread that isn't a portrait or an ad spread contains candid shots of students, suitable to the page's topic and theme. Included with the photographs are one or more captions, which describe each picture; these often begin with a.

In the past, most yearbooks were laid out by hand, with photographs physically cropped and placed on layout boards. The work was tedious and required multiple deadlines and contact with a yearbook publisher. Today, virtually all yearbooks are published using computers, which allows for shorter deadlines and easier editing. Students typically design pages using a desktop publishing program, usually Adobe InDesign. Some schools use a proprietary web-based design program belonging to the company that prints the book.

Publication

U.S. printing companies 
Yearbook printing companies usually have representatives who work with the adviser and staff at each school to assist in the creation of the yearbook.

Yearbook companies that use offset printing require that groups of pages be sent periodically, rather than all at once, to the plant. This is done to stagger the work required to complete yearbooks for all the schools they cover. After the editors review each page and make changes, the pages are sent to the yearbook plant, usually via the Internet. Yearbook companies that use digital printing methods may only require one submission since the entire book is printed at once.

If the proofing process is not performed online, the adviser and editors receive proofs (typically full-size prints) about a week or so after the submission of pages. This gives the school a final opportunity to make adjustments or changes. After all the proofs have been returned to the printing company the requested corrections are made, and the books are printed, bound, and then sent to the school for distribution. Two examples of printing companies include Balfour and Jostens.

A number of educational institutions and yearbook printing companies operate camps and summer sessions at which student yearbook personnel can learn or polish the skills they need in their work.

Distribution
Often, yearbooks are distributed at the end of a school year to allow students, teachers, and other members of the school to obtain the books and signatures/personal messages from classmates. In the U.S., those that distribute at this time may publish a supplemental insert with photographs from spring sports and milestone events (such as prom and graduation) and other important events. Many schools at which yearbooks are distributed at or before the end of a school year have a tradition of having students sign and leave notes on each other's yearbooks.

Some schools distribute yearbooks after the end of the school year—such as in July, at homecoming (US) in October, or at another designated time to include year-end activities. In some cases, yearbooks are mailed to the parents' homes of graduated seniors.

Digital yearbooks

A digital yearbook may contain text, images, audio, and video. While a traditional paper yearbook may contain 300+ pages, a digital yearbook can contain unlimited pages. The end product of a digital yearbook can be a CD-ROM, a DVD, or is captured in an eBook format. The first CD-ROM yearbook was created by students at South Eugene High School in 1990.

In 2014 Forever Connected created the first widely adopted interactive, mobile yearbook, based on the print edition. Students can sign, sticker, and send videos to classmates right from their mobile devices. It is the most widely used digital yearbook and was originally sold by traditional yearbook publishers and as an add-on to print purchases. In 2019 Forever Connected rebranded as FC Yearbook and began offering their platform directly to schools. A number of patents were awarded on the technology to the parent company Yearbooker, Inc. 
In 2021 FC Yearbook accommodated remote and in-person student signatures and offered a print edition with the digital signatures printed in the book, as a direct-to-home offer. This became the origin of "virtual yearbook day" where in-person and remote students could simultaneously sign each other's yearbook in a yearbook party.  On May 14, 2021, FC Yearbook announced the first print yearbook ordered from a digital yearbook in an app, marking "digital-first" as a unique change in the yearbook commerce model.

See also
 Annual Cyclopedia
 Columbia Scholastic Press Association
 National Scholastic Press Association
 Periodical
 Serial

References

Further reading
 Akers, M. (ed.), Scholastic Yearbook Fundamentals. 1993. New York: Columbia Scholastic Press Association.
 Blakely, D., and Evans, C., A Complete Guide to Yearbook Journalism. 1991. Sylvania, Ohio: Advise Publications.
 Cutsinger, J. and Herron, M., History Worth Repeating: A Chronology of School Yearbooks. 1996. Minneapolis, MN: Jostens, Inc.
 Hall, H.L., Yearbook Guidebook. 1994. Minneapolis, MN: National Scholastic Press Association.

External links 
 
 

 
Books by type
Education terminology

sv:Examenstidning